Tor Gunnar Johnsen is a retired Norwegian football forward. He is the father of Dennis Tørset Johnsen and Mikael Tørset Johnsen.

References

1971 births
Living people
Norwegian footballers
Odds BK players
Kongsvinger IL Toppfotball players
Rosenborg BK players
Molde FK players
Eliteserien players
Norwegian First Division players
Footballers from Trondheim
Association football forwards